Miss America 2002, the 75th Miss America pageant, was televised live from Boardwalk Hall in Atlantic City, New Jersey on Saturday, September 22, 2001 on the ABC Network. The pageant was won by Katie Harman of Oregon, the first woman representing that state to take the crown.

Prior to the competition, the delegates spent a weekend in Philadelphia, Pennsylvania where they participated in a parade and attended a reception and did some sightseeing. During their first week in Atlantic City, the September 11 attacks occurred, but despite the cancelling of the traditional pageant-eve parade, it was decided to hold the pageant as intended. The contestants themselves voted 2-1 to continue with the competition.

Results

Placements

Order of announcements

Top 20

Top 10

Top 5

Awards

Quality of Life award

Delegates

1 Age as of September 2001

Controversy
Following the pageant, the parents of Miss America 2002 wrote an eight page letter to the pageant's organizers complaining about mistreatment and fraudulent billing.

Judges
Janet Langhart Cohen
John H. Dalton
Sanford L. Fox
Karl Jurman
Harvey Mackay
Lee Meriwether
Patricia Northrup

References

External links
 Official Results

2002
2001 in the United States
2002 beauty pageants
2001 in New Jersey
September 2001 events in the United States
Events in Atlantic City, New Jersey
Impact of the September 11 attacks on television